Lehman Township is the name of some places in the U.S. state of Pennsylvania:

Lehman Township, Luzerne County, Pennsylvania
Lehman Township, Pike County, Pennsylvania

Pennsylvania township disambiguation pages